Volodar Glebovich of Minsk was a prince of Minsk belonging to the so-called Polotsk dynasty (or the Polotski) after the city and the principality Polotsk from where it originated. He was the son of Gleb Vseslavich of Minsk (death 1119) and Anastasia, a daughter of Yaropolk Izyaslavich. Volodar died after 1167, possibly 1176.

Volodar's family had long been in conflict with the Grand Prince of Kiev, Vladimir Monomach, who in 1113 (according to some information 1119) conquered Minsk from Volodar's father. Later, the remaining possessions of the Polotsk dynasty had been conquered by Vladimir's son Mstislav I of Kiev and its members were forced into exile to, inter alia, Constantinople. However, after Mstislav's death in 1132, the Kiev Empire slowly collapsed and the Polotsk dynasty could return to the Russian political scene.

Volodar was married June 5, 1135 (probably while in exile in Poland) to Richeza of Poland, Queen of Sweden, daughter of Bolesław III Wrymouth and widow of the Danish prince and short-lived King Magnus I of Sweden, who the year before fell in the Battle of Fotevik. Volodar and Richeza had the daughter Sofia of Minsk, who later married Valdemar the Great of Denmark.

The marriage of Volodar and Richeza was a political move by her father directed against the then alliance between Erik Emune of Denmark and the descendants of Monomach. Since several central actors in this conflict died and the position of the Monomies in Russia greatly weakened, the foundation of the marriage also fell, which was dissolved in divorce, after which Richeza married Sverker I of Sweden.

Misconception 
In ancient history research, Volodar was usually confused (among others by Nikolaj von Baumgarten) with the half-mythical prince Vladimir Vsevolodic of Novgorod.

References 
 John Lind "The Russian Marriages. Dynamic and Political Coalitions During the Danish Civil War of the 1130s" in (Danish)  Historical Journal  No. 2 1992.

1176 deaths
Rurik dynasty